Bada (also given as Bata) is an airbase in Russia located 3 km north-east of Bada in Zabaykalsky Krai. There are several clusters of remote revetments for fighter aircraft, and large tarmac.  Forward aviation base.

Station history

Units known to have served here include the 21 BAP (21st Bomber Aviation Regiment) flying Su-24 aircraft and 313 BAP (313rd Bomber Aviation Regiment) flying Su-24MR aircraft.
As of 2010 there were approximately 21 of the 30 assigned Su-24s operational.

The base also houses a long range radar installation  equipped with the P-14 "Tall King" 2D VHF radar (possibly the 5Н84A "Oborona-14" Tall King C) mobile version for early warning.

References

Soviet Air Force bases
Soviet Frontal Aviation
Russian Air Force bases